WKBS-TV, UHF analog channel 48, was an independent television station licensed to Burlington, New Jersey, United States, which served the Philadelphia, Pennsylvania television market. The station broadcast from 1965 to 1983.

History

On July 8, 1964, the Federal Communications Commission granted a construction permit to Kaiser Broadcasting for a new television station to operate on channel 41 in Burlington; an overhaul of UHF allocations nationwide in May 1965 resulted in the substitution of channel 48. The station first signed on the air on September 1, 1965. It was the second independent station in the Philadelphia market, having signed on almost six months after WIBF-TV (channel 29, later WTAF-TV and now WTXF-TV) and two weeks before WPHL-TV (channel 17) relaunched. WKBS-TV's studios were located at 3201 South 26th Street in South Philadelphia, and its transmitter was located on the Roxborough tower farm in Philadelphia. The station struggled at first, in part because it signed on only a year after the Federal Communications Commission (FCC) required television manufacturers to include UHF tuning capability. However, WKBS was on stronger financial footing than WPHL and WIBF, and quickly established itself as the leading independent in Philadelphia, retaining the top spot for almost a decade.

In 1973, Kaiser sold a minority interest in its operations to Field Communications, which owned WFLD-TV in Chicago.

WKBS's schedule was typical of most independent stations of the time, with a mix of off-network syndicated programs, children's programs, movies, and local-interest shows, including a dance show hosted by local radio personality Hy Lit, which also aired on at least three of Kaiser's other stations: WKBD-TV in Detroit, WKBG-TV in Boston and WKBF-TV in Cleveland. In addition, WKBS aired shows produced by other Kaiser stations, such as The Lou Gordon Program from WKBD; in a controversial 1972 episode, then-Philadelphia mayor Frank Rizzo, frustrated with Gordon's line of questioning, walked out of the interview. In the mid-1970s, WKBS also aired ABC shows that WPVI-TV (channel 6) preempted in favor of local programming, and during the 1976-77 season, it aired NBC shows preempted by KYW-TV (channel 3).

In 1977, Kaiser left the television business and sold its share of the stations, including WKBS-TV, to Field. For most of the next few years, WKBS waged a spirited battle with WTAF for first place among the city's independents. However, by the early 1980s, WTAF was the entrenched top independent in Philadelphia.

News operation
WKBS-TV operated a small news department during its early years, producing a newscast at the station's morning sign-on time, and providing news updates during the course of the broadcast day as well as a 10 p.m. newscast. Among channel 48's first on-air reporters was Jim Vance, who started his television career with WKBS in 1968 before moving to WRC-TV in Washington, D.C., in 1969. The station experimented with an hour-long news program from 1968 to 1969; it would be more than 20 years until another hour-long 10 p.m. show aired in Philadelphia.

In the 1970s, WKBS-TV attempted a 10 p.m. newscast. However, the experiment failed, apparently because the Philadelphia market was not ready for a prime-time newscast. From the late 1970s until the station went dark, channel 48 would air news updates anchored by Pat Farnack. Starting in 1982, the station aired a news simulcast of CNN2 (now HLN) with local news inserts at 10 p.m. on weekdays. Marty Jacobs also hosted a public affairs program.

Closure
In 1982, a nasty dispute over the operation of Field Communications between brothers Marshall Field V and Frederick W. Field resulted in the liquidation of their company, including their broadcasting interests. By June 1983, three of Field's stations had already been sold, leaving the company with its Philadelphia and Detroit outlets. While many larger broadcast groups were interested in the station, and channel 48 was profitable, none were willing to pay Field's asking price. The Providence Journal Company, owners of WPHL-TV, offered to buy WKBS, sell WPHL's channel 17 broadcast license to a religious broadcaster and merge WPHL and WKBS' stronger programming under WKBS' license and channel allocation. However, Journal's offer was still well below Field's asking price. WKBS employees tried to obtain financing to buy the station themselves but also could not meet the asking price.

Finally, with no acceptable takers for either station and facing a deadline to close down the company, Field announced on July 15, 1983, that it would shut down WKBS-TV at the end of August. Field held onto WKBD in Detroit for a few more weeks before selling it to Cox Enterprises that fall (the sale was finally consummated in February 1984). Most of channel 48's programming (except for shows provided by syndication firm Viacom) and some production equipment were sold to WPHL-TV, while the station's license was returned to the FCC. On August 30, 1983, following the telecast of a college football game, WKBS-TV signed off for the final time. The sign-off sequence, usually a film of The Star-Spangled Banner, was instead replaced by a video of the employees saying farewell accompanied by a few instrumental lines of Auld Lang Syne and the last few lines of Simon and Garfunkel's "The Sound of Silence".

The sequence began with an editorial by the station's final general manager, Vincent F. Baressi:

After the following things above, the WKBS-TV logo appeared on-screen for a few more seconds, and then the transmitters were shut off forever as snow appeared on people's television screens. 82 staffers lost their jobs.

Epilogue
After channel 48 went off the air, the Philadelphia market was left with two independents. The first station to make a serious attempt to replace WKBS as the market's third indie outlet was WRBV-TV (channel 65, now WUVP), based in Vineland, New Jersey in June 1985. A short time later, WRBV was sold to the broadcasting arm of the Asbury Park Press, which changed its calls to WSJT. This station never nearly matched what had been offered on WKBS, and was also hampered by an inadequate signal which leaned to the southeast.

Then, in October 1985, former subscription television outlet WWSG-TV (channel 57, now WPSG) became a full-service independent and changed its calls to WGBS-TV. WSJT briefly attempted to wage a ratings battle with WGBS, but this was over before it even started due to WSJT's aforementioned weak signal. Within a few months, WGBS established itself as the third independent in Philadelphia. Despite financial problems within the station's ownership, WGBS gave WTAF-TV a serious challenge for the top spot among Philadelphia's independent outlets.

The battle to replace WKBS on channel 48 in Burlington, New Jersey, proved bitter. Eleven applications were designated for hearing in September 1984, and the FCC selected the application of Dorothy Brunson, an African-American radio station owner from Baltimore, in February 1986. Cornerstone had, during the interim, purchased channel 48's transmitter, moved it to Altoona and used it to sign on a new station in 1985 on channel 47, using the WKBS-TV call letters.

Brunson signed her station on as WGTW-TV on August 13, 1992. The station carried on as an independent for more than a decade before being sold to the Trinity Broadcasting Network in 2004.

Out of market cable carriage
In its final years, channel 48, along with rivals WPHL and WTAF, was carried on cable systems throughout the New York City market portion of Northern and Central New Jersey, as well as parts of the Baltimore and Harrisburg markets.  When the announcement was made that the station was going dark, the systems began to gradually remove the station from their lineups.

On-air staff

Notable former on-air staff
Marty Jacobs, Mgr News/Public Affairs (1972 to the end) first Nationally run News For Children (Mini-News), award-winning community affairs, became one of the first 12 hosts at the start of QVC.
Pat Farnack - part-time news anchor for 1980 attempt to create 10p newscast, now midday anchor at WCBS radio in New York). Her late husband was Dan Foley, a staff announcer there.
Dan Foley - full-time staff announcer from 1965 sign on until the 1983 sign off. He pre-recorded most of the station's announcements, promotions, and voiceover work for local commercials. He hosted the film about Valley Forge which plays every open day at the Valley Forge National Park Battlefield. He died in 2002.
Dr. Don Rose - part-time staff announcer, known for his airshifts on WFIL. He hosted the children's block of weekday afternoon, morning, and Sunday morning cartoons. He also had pre-recorded announcements during the weekday transitional 5:00 p.m. hour once identifying the station as "WKBS...a service of Kaiser Broad-chasing". He also hosted the children's shows from the station's 1965 sign on until the station went dark in 1983.
Doug Johnson - anchor (1968–1969; later a reporter and anchor at WABC-TV in New York City; now retired)
Hy Lit - legendary Philadelphia radio personality who hosted The Hy Lit Show
Stu Nahan - played children's show host Captain Philadelphia and anchored a sports highlight show (later became a sports anchor at television stations in Los Angeles; now deceased)
Jim Vance - reporter (1968–1969; later anchored at WRC-TV in Washington, D.C.; now deceased) 
Bill "Wee Willie" Webber - children's programming host (1976–1979)

References

External links 
Broadcast Pioneer's Website page describing the history of WKBS and the reason for going dark, with audio of Vincent Barresi's farewell speech

KBS-TV
Kaiser Broadcasting
Field Communications
Television channels and stations established in 1965
Television channels and stations disestablished in 1983
1983 disestablishments in Pennsylvania
Defunct television stations in the United States
1965 establishments in Pennsylvania
KBS
KBS